Algorithmic game theory (AGT) is an area in the intersection of game theory and computer science, with the objective of understanding and design of algorithms in strategic environments.

Typically, in Algorithmic Game Theory problems, the input to a given algorithm is distributed among many players who have a personal interest in the output. In those situations, the agents might not report the input truthfully because of their own personal interests. We can see Algorithmic Game Theory from two perspectives:

 Analysis: given the currently implemented algorithms, analyze them using Game Theory tools (e.g., calculate and prove properties on their Nash equilibria, price of anarchy, and best-response dynamics)
 Design: design games that have both good game-theoretical and algorithmic properties. This area is called algorithmic mechanism design.

On top of the usual requirements in classical algorithm design (e.g., polynomial-time running time, good approximation ratio), the designer must also care about incentive constraints.

History

Nisan-Ronen: a new framework for studying algorithms

In 1999, the seminal paper of Nisan and Ronen  drew the attention of the Theoretical Computer Science community to designing algorithms for selfish (strategic) users. As they claim in the abstract:

This paper coined the term algorithmic mechanism design and was recognized by the 2012 Gödel Prize committee as one of "three papers laying foundation of growth in Algorithmic Game Theory".

Price of Anarchy

The other two papers cited in the 2012 Gödel Prize for fundamental contributions to Algorithmic Game Theory introduced and developed the concept of "Price of Anarchy". 
In their 1999 paper "Worst-case Equilibria", Koutsoupias and Papadimitriou proposed a new measure of the degradation of system efficiency due to the selfish behavior of its agents: the ratio of between system efficiency at an optimal configuration, and its efficiency at the worst Nash equilibrium. (The term "Price of Anarchy" only appeared a couple of years later.)

The Internet as a catalyst
The Internet created a new economy—both as a foundation for exchange and commerce, and in its own right. The computational nature of the Internet allowed for the use of computational tools in this new emerging economy. On the other hand, the Internet itself is the outcome of actions of many. This was new to the classic, ‘top-down’ approach to computation that held till then. Thus, game theory is a natural way to view the Internet and interactions within it, both human and mechanical.

Game theory studies equilibria (such as the Nash equilibrium). An equilibrium is generally defined as a state in which no player has an incentive to change their strategy. Equilibria are found in several fields related to the Internet, for instance financial interactions and communication load-balancing. Game theory provides tools to analyze equilibria, and a common approach is then to ‘find the game’—that is, to formalize specific Internet interactions as a game, and to derive the associated equilibria.

Rephrasing problems in terms of games allows the analysis of Internet-based interactions and the construction of mechanisms to meet specified demands. If equilibria can be shown to exist, a further question must be answered: can an equilibrium be found, and in reasonable time? This leads to the analysis of algorithms for finding equilibria. Of special importance is the complexity class PPAD, which includes many problems in algorithmic game theory.

Areas of research

Algorithmic mechanism design

Mechanism design is the subarea of economics that deals with optimization under incentive constraints. Algorithmic mechanism design considers the optimization of economic systems under computational efficiency requirements. Typical objectives studied include revenue maximization and social welfare maximization.

Inefficiency of equilibria
The concepts of price of anarchy and price of stability were introduced to capture the loss in performance of a system due to the selfish behavior of its participants. The price of anarchy captures the worst-case performance of the system at equilibrium relative to the optimal performance possible. The price of stability, on the other hand, captures the relative performance of the best equilibrium of the system. These concepts are counterparts to the notion of approximation ratio in algorithm design.

Complexity of finding equilibria
The existence of an equilibrium in a game is typically established using non-constructive fixed point theorems. There are no efficient algorithms known for computing Nash equilibria. The problem is complete for the complexity class PPAD even in 2-player games. In contrast, correlated equilibria can be computed efficiently using linear programming, as well as learned via no-regret strategies.

Computational social choice

Computational social choice studies computational aspects of social choice, the aggregation of individual agents' preferences. Examples include algorithms and computational complexity of voting rules and coalition formation.

Other topics include:

 Algorithms for computing Market equilibria
 Fair division
 Multi-agent systems

And the area counts with diverse practical applications:

 Sponsored search auctions
 Spectrum auctions
 Cryptocurrencies
 Prediction markets
 Reputation systems
 Sharing economy
 Matching markets such as kidney exchange and school choice
 Crowdsourcing and peer grading
 Economics of the cloud

Journals and newsletters 
 ACM Transactions on Economics and Computation (TEAC) 
 SIGEcom Exchanges 

Algorithmic Game Theory papers are often also published in Game Theory journals such as GEB, Economics journals such as Econometrica, and Computer Science journals such as SICOMP.

See also
Auction Theory
Computational social choice
Load balancing (computing)
Mechanism design
Multi-agent system
Voting in game theory

References

 John von Neumann, Oskar Morgenstern (1944) Theory of Games and Economic Behavior. Princeton Univ. Press. 2007 edition: 
.

External links
gambit.sourceforge.net - a library of game theory software and tools for the construction and analysis of finite extensive and strategic games.
gamut.stanford.edu - a suite of game generators designated for testing game-theoretic algorithms.

Game theory
Theory of computation
Algorithms